Catherine Gardiner (27 April 1900 - 11 August 1982) was a British theatre actress, artists’ model, amateur golfer and muse and wife of the portrait painter, David Jagger RP, ROI (1891-1958).

Life and career
Gardiner was born in Chelsea, London in 1900. The Gardiner family were firmly attached to the applied arts, her father, Samuel Gardiner was an 'ornate tile mason', following in his father’s footsteps who was a ‘monumental tile fixer’.

As a teenager she became a stage actress and was employed in various productions in the West End of London. She went under the pseudonym of Joan Gordon and was usually employed to undertake minor character roles. At the same time she was an artist’s model, who sat for a wide number professional artist’s including, Augustus John, Ambrose McEvoy, Alfred Munnings and Walter Westley Russell (later Keeper of the Royal Academy Schools).

She modelled for a number of artists associated with the Chelsea Arts Club. In the spring of 1919, Gardiner, then aged nineteen, sat for David Jagger. He became captivated by her and they began a romanic relationship. She became his muse and he always referred to her as 'Kitty'.

Married Life
After her wedding to David Jagger she changed the spelling of her Christian name to Katherine. Her only child, Brian was born in November 1921, prior to which, she abandoned her career as a stage actress. ‘Kitty’ Jagger appeared in many of her husband’s most accomplished works of the period, usually listed under a pseudonym. Portraits of her by her husband were exhibited with the principal exhibiting societies across London, most notably the Royal Academy where three large portraits of her were shown between 1923-29 to great acclaim. Those works being, The Jade Necklace (1923), Eve (1925) and ‘Mrs. David Jagger’ (1929). Eight further canvases were exhibited at the Walker Art Gallery in Liverpool between 1921 and 1928, two of which were acquired by municipal art galleries,  ‘Kathleen (1922) by the Williamson Art Gallery and Museum and ‘Needlework’ (1921) by the Walker Art Gallery, the work is currently listed as ‘Sewing’. Other portraits of her exhibited in London received unanimous praise January 1922 The Studio January 1922 (Vol.83 p.41) Royal Society of Portrait Painters exhibition review (‘Eileen’ illustrated)

Her photogenic beauty led to many images of her appearing in the London society magazines, most notably the TatlerThe Tatler 23 October 1935 ‘Mr & Mrs. David Jagger at Home in Chelsea’ p.5 'Kitty' epitomised the roaring twenties in London and she was often compared to the American actress, Tallulah Bankhead. Throughout the decade she was captured by many leading of London’s leading photographers. ‘Kitty’ was a keen amateur golfer who played on major courses in England, Scotland, France and Ireland. She was also a talented amateur artist and a connoisseur of antique furniture. In 1935 she was one of the members who organised a major touring exhibition, ‘Charles Sargeant Jagger - A Memorial Exhibition’ (1935–37). Two portraits of her appeared in her husband’s only London solo exhibition at the J. Leger & Son in 1935. In 1940, during the London Blitz she was lucky to survive when an adjoining property to her Chelsea home was destroyed by a bomb.

Later life
Following her husband’s death in January 1958 she resided for many years in West Sussex and died in Kingston upon Thames on 11 August 1982, aged eighty-two.

Principal Portraits
Works listed were painted by David Jagger RP, ROI, unless indicated otherwise.

 ‘Lady in A Green Jacket (1919) Private Collection
 ‘New Year's Morning in a Chelsea Studio (1919) by Sir Alfred Munnings, Private Collection
 ‘On The Hilltop (1920) Private Collection
 ‘Sketch for 'Needlework (1920/21) Private Collection
 ‘Needlework (1921) Walker Art Gallery, Liverpool (National Museums Liverpool)
 ‘Eileen (1921) untraced
 ‘Pierette (1921) Private Collection
 ‘The Yellow Jumper (1921) Private Collection
 ''‘The White Cap (1922) Private Collection
 ‘Kathleen (1922) Williamson Art Gallery & Museum, Birkenhead, The Wirral
 ‘The Yellow Breakfast Cup (1922) Private Collection
 ‘Joan (1923) untraced
 ‘Le Chapeau Noir (1923) Private Collection
 ‘Study for 'The Jade Necklace (1922/23) Private Collection
 ‘The Jade Necklace (1923) Private Collection
 ‘Mrs. David Jagger (1925) by Sir Walter Westley Russell, Private Collection
 ‘Eve (1925) Private Collection
 ‘The Young Golfer (1927) Private Collection
 ‘Mrs. David Jagger (c.1929) Private Collection
 ''‘Mrs. David Jagger (1930) Private Collection
 ‘Mrs. David Jagger (1934) Private Collection
 ''‘Mrs. David Jagger''' (1935) Private Collection

External links
 thejaggerfamily

References 

English artists' models
British stage actresses
People from Chelsea, London
1900 births
1982 deaths